"Ai bylbylyum" is a Tatar and Bashkir folk song.

Lyrics sample

References

Tatar folk songs
Bashkir folk songs
Year of song unknown
Songwriter unknown